The 2008–09 Queensland Roar season was the club's fourth season participating in the A-League where they would finish in 3rd place in the regular season.

Squad
Full time squad as of 31 July 2008

Player Movement 

 
¤ Reinaldo transferred to Busan I'Park at the end of the 2007/08 A-League season and returned to Queensland in July 2008 on a free transfer.

Pre-Season

Roar Roadshow

Translink Cup

2008 A-League Pre-Season Challenge Cup

Hyundai A-League 2008–09 
Round 1

Round 2

Round 3

Round 4

Round 5

Round 6

Round 7

Round 8

Round 9

Round 10

Round 11

Round 12

Round 13

Round 14

Round 15

Round 16

Round 17

Round 18

Round 19

Round 20

Round 21

Finals series 
Minor semi-final – away leg

Minor semi-final – home leg

Preliminary final (One Leg – Played away to loser of major semi-final)

Ladder position

References

2008–09
2008–09 A-League season by team